Al Jazeirah Airport  is a private airfield operated by the Al Jazeirah Aviation Club and is located near Al Jazirah Al Hamra, Ras al-Khaimah, UAE.

References

Airports in the United Arab Emirates